William Carr (born July 13, 1975) is a former Arena football defensive / offensive lineman. He played college football at Michigan. He was drafted by the Cincinnati Bengals in the 7th round (217th overall) of the 1997 NFL draft.

College career
Carr attended Michigan. While there he was named First-team All-Big Ten in 1996 as well as College and Professional Football News as a First-team All-American. He finished third on Michigan's career tackles-for-loss list.

College statistics

Professional career
Carr was selected in the 7th round (217th overall) in the 1997 NFL draft by the Cincinnati Bengals.

In 1999, he joined the Orlando Predators of the Arena Football League (AFL). While with the Predators, he recorded 13 tackles, four sacks, one pass break up, two forced fumbles and one blocked field goal. In 2000, he joined the Barcelona Dragons of NFL Europe. On April 26, 2003, Carr was signed by the Georgia Force. While there he recorded two tackles, for the season. For 2004, he recorded 15 tackles and 3.5 sacks for the Force. In 2005, he joined the Grand Rapids Rampage where he recorded nine tackles. In March, 2005, he was traded to the Predators in exchange for Cecil Caldwell. During his second and final stint with the Predators he recorded seven tackles and one sack.

Career statistics

Coaching career
Carr became the defensive line coach at Arizona Western College in 2012, a position he held until 2013. After which he joined the coaching staff at Michigan under head coach Brady Hoke as a student assistant. He spent two seasons at Michigan. In February 2016, it was reported that Carr would be joining the Texas coaching staff. He joined Texas as a Special Assistant/Analyst.

Personal life
After he retired from playing football, Carr ran his on apparel company called Will-O. In 2014, Carr returned to Ann Arbor, Michigan to finish his degree in kinesiology.

References

External links
 Morgan State Bears bio
 Bentley Historical Library (University of Michigan) bio
 Preds' Carr Has A Story With Very Happy Ending

1975 births
Living people
American football defensive linemen
Michigan Wolverines football players
Cincinnati Bengals players
Orlando Predators players
Barcelona Dragons players
Georgia Force players
Grand Rapids Rampage players
Arizona Western Matadors football coaches
Michigan Wolverines football coaches
Texas Longhorns football coaches
Players of American football from Dallas
Expatriate players of American football
American expatriate sportspeople in Spain
Morgan State Bears football coaches